Beruniy District is a district of Karakalpakstan in Uzbekistan. The capital lies at the city Beruniy.

The district contains one city (Beruniy), one urban-type settlement (Bulish) and 13 village councils.

References

Karakalpakstan
Districts of Uzbekistan